Marcus Pereira may refer to:

 Marcos Soares Pereira (died 1655), Portuguese composer
 Marcos Pereira (politician) (born 1972), Brazilian lawyer, bishop, and politician
 Marcos Pereira (footballer, born 1973), Brazilian football midfielder
 Marcos Pereira (footballer, born 1975), Brazilian football forward
 Marcos Pereira (footballer, born 1985), Paraguayan football midfielder